My Generation is the debut studio album by English rock band the Who, released on 3 December 1965 by Brunswick Records in the United Kingdom, and Festival Records in Australia. In the United States, it was released on 25 April 1966 by Decca Records as The Who Sings My Generation, with a different cover and a slightly altered track listing. Besides the members of the Who, being Roger Daltrey (vocals), Pete Townshend (guitar), John Entwistle (bass) and Keith Moon (drums), the album features contributions by session musician Nicky Hopkins (piano).

The album was made immediately after the Who got their first singles on the charts and, according to the booklet in the Deluxe Edition, it was later dismissed by the band as something of a rush job that did not accurately represent their stage performance of the time.  While it didn't sell as well as later albums, peaking at No. 5 on the UK charts and failing to chart in the US, critics have since retrospectively rated it as one of the best rock albums of all time, especially noting its hard sound unusual for the time, and presaging various hard rock styles such as punk and heavy metal.

Recording and songs
By 1965, the Who were all set after recruiting drummer Keith Moon, and saw their former band name change from the Detours to the Who, after briefly being called the High Numbers. In the spring of 1965, the album was started during the Who's early "Maximum R&B" period and features cover versions of the popular R&B songs "I Don't Mind" and "Please, Please, Please", both originally by James Brown, in addition to the R&B leanings of the tracks written by the band's guitarist Pete Townshend.  Nine tracks were recorded, but several of them were rejected for Townshend originals made at new sessions that began in October.

According to the booklet in the Deluxe Edition, "I'm a Man" was eliminated from the US release due to its sexual content. The US album also used the edited UK single version of "The Kids Are Alright", which cut a brief instrumental section laden with manic drum rolls and guitar feedback before the final verse.

Many of the songs on the album saw release as singles. Aside from "My Generation", which preceded the album's release and reached No. 2 on the UK Singles Chart, "A Legal Matter", "La-La-La Lies", and "The Kids Are Alright" were also released as domestic singles by Brunswick after the band had started releasing new material on the Reaction label in 1966. As they were not promoted by the band, they were not as commercially successful as "My Generation" or the Reaction singles. "The Kids Are Alright" was however a top 10 single in Sweden, peaking at No. 8.

"My Generation" and "The Kids Are Alright" in particular remain two of the group's most-covered songs; while "My Generation" is a raw, aggressive number that presaged the heavy metal and punk rock movements, "The Kids Are Alright" is a more sophisticated pop number, with chiming guitars, three-part harmonies, and a lilting vocal melody, though still retaining the driving rhythm of other Who songs of the period. The album is considered an important forerunner of the "power pop" movement. "Circles" was notably covered by contemporaries of the group, British freakbeat outfit Les Fleur de Lys. The cover version has found some notice after its inclusion on Nuggets II: Original Artyfacts from the British Empire and Beyond, 1964–1969.

Release history
The UK release featured a cover image of the band standing beside some oil drums and looking upward to the camera, with splashes of colour added by the red and blue stencilled letters of the title and a jacket patterned after the Union Flag thrown over John Entwistle's shoulders. Pete Townshend was wearing his school scarf. For the US release, this was replaced with a portrait of the band standing beneath Big Ben.

In 1974, The Who Sings My Generation was re-issued by MCA Records in the US and Canada as part of a budget priced double album set which also included the 1968 compilation album Magic Bus: The Who on Tour. The reissue peaked at No. 185 on the Billboard 200.

The UK mono album was briefly reissued in Britain in 1979 by Virgin Records, during the height of the country's Mod revival. The bands of that scene owed a direct debt to the Who for inspiration, and the younger generations of their fans were keen to explore those original influences. This pressing of the album went out of print in 1980, meaning there was no official UK edition of "My Generation" again available until the Deluxe edition remaster of 2002.

In 2002, the album was remixed into stereo and remastered for a Deluxe Edition by Shel Talmy. This was the first time any of these songs had seen a stereo release. While sounding clearer in stereo, this edition omits many overdubs that are prominent in the original mono mixes, notably the lead guitar parts in "A Legal Matter" and "My Generation" (though both songs in their mono mixes close disc 2) and the double tracked vocals in "The Good's Gone", "Much Too Much", "La-La-La Lies" and "The Kids Are Alright".

In 2008, the album's original UK mono mix was remastered for the Japanese market, appearing in limited numbers as a double-CD box set and a regular single CD album. Both variations included bonus tracks recorded in 1965. The stereo mixes were taken from the 2002 Deluxe Edition release.

In 2012, the album was released using a flat transfer from the original master tapes (for the mono disc) and released in Japan in 2012 as part of a two-disc mono and stereo set with bonus tracks. In the same year, My Generation was released in mono in the UK as a single disc without bonus tracks, using newer generation tapes several times removed from the original master tape.

In 2014, My Generation was released on iTunes and HDtracks in mono and stereo versions with bonus tracks. The mono version was mastered from the same source as the 2012 Japanese release. The stereo version has mixes different from those on the 2002 Deluxe Edition release.

On 18 November 2016, Brunswick/Polydor Europe released a 5-CD deluxe edition that includes most previous versions of this complicated product in one collection (Brunswick – 5372740, Polydor – 5372740, UMC – 5372740).  The Set includes, Disc 1: The Original Mono Mixes; Disc 2: The Stereo Mixes; Disc 3: The Original Mono Mixes – Bonus Tracks; Disc 4: The Original Stereo Mixes – Bonus Tracks; Disc 5: Primal Scoop – The 1964–1965 Demo Mixes

Reception and legacy 

In his 1967 column for Esquire, music critic Robert Christgau called My Generation "the hardest rock in history". In 1981, he included its American version in his "basic record library". Richie Unterberger hailed the album as "the hardest mod pop" ever recorded in a retrospective review for AllMusic: "At the time of its release, it also had the most ferociously powerful guitars and drums yet captured on a rock record." Mark Kemp wrote of the record in The Rolling Stone Album Guide (2004):

The American edition of the album was included in "A Basic Record Library" of 1950s and 1960s recordings, published in Christgau's Record Guide: Rock Albums of the Seventies (1981). In 2000, musician Elvis Costello named the album one of his "500 [favorite] albums that can only improve your life" and "better than everything that I've made". In 2003, My Generation was ranked number 236 on Rolling Stone magazine's list of the 500 greatest albums of all time, then was re-ranked number 237 on the 2012 revised list, and named the second greatest guitar album of all time by Mojo magazine. In 2004, it was No. 18 in Q magazine's list of the 50 Best British Albums Ever. In 2006, it was ranked No. 49 in NMEs list of the 100 Greatest British Albums. In 2004, the title track was No. 11 in Rolling Stone magazine's list of the 500 greatest songs of all time. In 2006, "The Kids Are Alright" was No. 34 in Pitchfork's list of the 200 greatest songs of the 1960s. In June 2009, the edited 1966 US version of the album "The Who Sings My Generation" was selected by the Library of congress for preservation in the National Recording Registry for being "Culturally, historically and aesthetically significant". Writing for the BBC, Chris Jones described the album as "one of the most vital and important reasons to love rock 'n' roll".

Track listing
Original release (1965)
All tracks written by Pete Townshend, except where noted.

The Who Sings My Generation (1966)

Deluxe Edition (2002)

Digital releases (2014)

 B-sides 

PersonnelThe WhoRoger Daltrey – lead vocals, harmonica, tambourine on "I Can't Explain"
Pete Townshend – electric guitar, backing vocals, lead vocals on "A Legal Matter"
John Entwistle – bass guitar, backing vocals
Keith Moon – drums, backing vocals on "Instant Party"Additional musicians'
Nicky Hopkins – piano
The Ivy League – backing vocals on "I Can't Explain" and "Bald Headed Woman"
Perry Ford – piano on "I Can't Explain"
Jimmy Page – lead guitar on "Bald Headed Woman"

Charts

Certifications

See also
British invasion
British rock
Mod (subculture)

References

Bibliography

External links
 

1965 debut albums
Brunswick Records albums
Albums produced by Shel Talmy
Decca Records albums
The Who albums
Garage rock albums by English artists
Power pop albums by English artists
Rhythm and blues albums by English artists
United States National Recording Registry recordings
Albums recorded at IBC Studios
United States National Recording Registry albums